William Silcock (22 February 1868 – 30 July 1933) was an English cricketer.  Born at Croston, Lancashire, he made six appearances in first-class cricket.

Silcock made his first-class cricket debut for Lancashire in 1899 against Warwickshire at Edgbaston. It wasn't until 1902 that he next appeared in first-class cricket, making a further five appearances in the 1902 County Championship. He scored a total of 82 runs in his six matches, with a high score of 43. With the ball he took 5 wickets, with best figures of 2/68, although he did a distinctively high bowling average of 73.40. He later played club cricket in the Lancashire League for Church between 1903–1909.

He died at Leyland, Lancashire on 30 July 1933.

References

External links
William Silcock at ESPNcricinfo
William Silcock at CricketArchive

1868 births
1933 deaths
People from Croston
English cricketers
Lancashire cricketers